Church of Our Lady of Perpetual Help in Tarnobrzeg is a church in Serbinów, Poland.

The church consists of the upper, bottom church and buildings adjoining to them. The altar of the upper church consists of three parts: saint Michael the Archangel, the Cross, and the Mother of God of the Incessant Help. The whole is carried out in the form of mosaic. Demons attacking people are in a left hand of the altar. At the end of the first part of the altar crowds of people are becoming waves. The Archangel is separating them and with walking stick is reproving in the direction of the Cross and the Mother of God. In part centre a huge crucifix is found. There are no specific ideas of people or demons, but a symbolism of waves was kept. Individual persons are turning up at the right part of the altar - already as praying and adoring God, with crosses in the hand. A side altar of the Merciful Jesus kept the similar style of mosaic. The left, side nave is filled up with four stained glass referring to evangelical acts of the mercy. Low relieves are in right, side naves Polish saint. A very large choir is in an upper church. The building was being built in 1980s, when the Polish Catholic Church thought that he would fail to obtain the new permission from communist authorities to the new temple. Tarnobrzeg was very quickly developed, and civil authorities were counting, that in the year 2000 the number of inhabitants will exceed 100,000. It extorted construction of the huge church, being able to hold a few thousand people. Provost of the parish is prelate Michał Józefczyk.

Bottom church
The bottom church is much smaller. A brass low relief of the Last Supper is a main element of the altar. At present also Chapel of The Adoration of The Holy Sacrament is located in it with the mosaic altar.

Building complex
On the area there are also buildings donated to the Congregation Of Sisters Służebniczki are finding and to the priests servicing in the parish. Other buildings are: the church hall, religious education small rooms, the chemist, the kindergarten/orphanage and the hospice. At entering the church figures of four Evangelists were placed. On the facade a huge mural of Our Lady of Fatima was painted.

Relics
Relics were integrated into the main altar of the upper church following saint: 
 Edmund Bojanowski
 Jan Bosko
 Albert Chmielowski
 Zygmunt Gorazdowski
 Mother Teresa
 Faustyna Kowalska
 Gianna Beretta Molla
 Padre Pio

Belfry
Bells are on a belfry: Maria, Michał, Maksymilian. For the first time they rang on 25 March 1984.

Stained glass
Into so much church a huge window was left so that the temple was bright. In the 90s, with the objective of protection of organ pipes the window was covered with stained glass. Several years' works were finished in 1997 r. In it history was described beautiful image/icons of the Mother of God of the Incessant Help. Maciej Kauczyński is the initiator of the scheme. Workmanship Studios of stained glass - Krzysztof Packet, Andrzej Cwilewicz.

See also
 Parish of Our Lady of Perpetual Help in Tarnobrzeg
 Dzikovia Castle in Tarnobrzeg - around 1 km from the church

Serbinów
Roman Catholic churches completed in 2004
21st-century Roman Catholic church buildings
21st-century churches in Poland